Bengassou (also spelled Bingassou) is a town in east-central Ivory Coast. It is a sub-prefecture of Bocanda Department in N'Zi Region, Lacs District.

Bengassou was a commune until March 2012, when it became one of 1126 communes nationwide that were abolished.

In 2014, the population of the sub-prefecture of Bengassou was 22,891.

Villages
The 24 villages of the sub-prefecture of Bengassou and their population in 2014 are:

References

Sub-prefectures of N'Zi Region
Former communes of Ivory Coast